Saint Sigolena of Albi (fl. 7th. c.) was an Albigensian deaconess and saint from Albi, France.

Sigolena was born into a noble family of Aquitaine.

Upon wedding during adolescence, she desired a chaste marriage and offered her husband all of her possessions to "gain the freedom of her body". When she was 24, he died unexpectedly and she had difficulties convincing her parents she did not want to marry again. Eventually, she was able to persuade her father to build her a convent.

Her church in Metz was situated near that of Saint Ferreolus of Besançon. Sigolena's biography was written by an anonymous author.

Veneration

The relics of St Sigolena are in Albi Cathedral.

Her feast day is July 24.

References

Further reading
Klapisch-Zuber, Christiane, ed. A History of Women in the West, vol. II: Silences of the Middle Ages. Cambridge: Belknap-Harvard, 1992.

7th-century Frankish saints
7th-century Frankish women
Catholic deaconesses
People from Albi